Underground, a thriller written by Michael Sloane (sometimes spelt Sloan) and produced at the Royal Alexandra Theatre, Toronto and following a UK tour, at the Prince of Wales Theatre, London, opening on 4 July 1983. It was directed by Simon Williams.

Plot
Described by the script publisher as follows: 
A tense and claustrophobic thriller emerges when twelve people become trapped in a London Underground train carriage. The fear of being trapped underground with very little air and apparently no rescue service underway becomes very real as we witness the initial panic and fear experienced by the passengers. As the temperature rises and tempers fray, an electrical shortage on the train shrouds a brutal murder and when the lights eventually come up we are faced with a new and more chilling revelation - there is a murderer aboard and nowhere to run.

Cast
 Raymond Burr
 Gerald Flood
 Linda Hayden
 Ronald Leigh-Hunt
 Elspeth March
 Alfred Marks
 Patrick O'Connell
 Marc Sinden
 Peter Wyngarde

References

1983 plays
West End plays
Thriller plays
London Underground in popular culture